"The Youngest Was the Most Loved" is the second single from English singer-songwriter Morrissey's eighth studio album, Ringleader of the Tormentors (2006). The track was written by Morrissey and Jesse Tobias. It was released as a single on 5 June 2006 and reached number 14 on the UK Singles Chart. The song was performed on the popular UK television chat show Friday Night with Jonathan Ross on 19 May 2006 and again on Later with Jools Holland on 2 June 2006.

B-side "A Song from Under the Floorboards" is a song originally written and recorded by Magazine, a post-punk band which shares Manchester origins with Morrissey.

Track listings
CD single
 "The Youngest Was the Most Loved" (Morrissey/Tobias)
 "If You Don't Like Me, Don't Look at Me" (Morrissey/Tobias)

7-inch
 "The Youngest Was the Most Loved" (Morrissey/Tobias)
 "If You Don't Like Me, Don't Look at Me" (Morrissey/Tobias)

Maxi single
 "The Youngest Was the Most Loved" (Morrissey/Tobias)
 "Ganglord" (Morrissey/Whyte)
 "A Song from Under the Floorboards" (Adamson/Devoto/Doyle/Formula/McGeoch)
 "The Youngest Was the Most Loved" (Video)

US single
 "The Youngest Was the Most Loved" (Morrissey/Tobias)
 "If You Don't Like Me, Don't Look at Me" (Morrissey/Tobias)
 "A Song From Under the Floorboards" (Adamson/Devoto/Doyle/Formula/McGeoch)
 "Ganglord" (Morrissey/Whyte)
 "The Youngest Was the Most Loved" (Video)

Personnel
 Morrissey: voice
 Boz Boorer: guitars
 Jesse Tobias: guitars
 Alain Whyte: guitars
 Gary Day: bass
 Michael Farrell: keyboard
 Matt Chamberlain: drums (only on the A-side)
 Matt Walker: drums (only on the B-sides)

Charts

References

External links
 Official Single info
 Single info

Morrissey songs
2005 songs
2006 singles
Sanctuary Records singles
Song recordings produced by Tony Visconti
Songs written by Jesse Tobias
Songs written by Morrissey